Hallmark Hall of Fame, originally called Hallmark Television Playhouse, is an anthology program on American television, sponsored by Hallmark Cards, a Kansas Citybased greeting card company. The longest-running prime-time series in the history of television, it first aired in 1951 and continues into the present day. From 1954 onward, all of its productions have been broadcast in color. It was one of the first video productions to telecast in color, a rarity in the 1950s. Many television films have been shown on the program since its debut, though the program began with live telecasts of dramas and then changed to videotaped productions before finally changing to filmed ones.

The series has received eighty-one Emmy Awards, dozens  of Christopher and Peabody Awards, nine Golden Globes, and Humanitas Prizes. Once a common practice in American television, it is one of the last remaining television programs where the title includes the name of its sponsor. Unlike other long-running TV series still on the air, it differs in that it broadcasts only occasionally and not on a weekly broadcast programming schedule.

The Hall of Fame films have an above average budget and production values nearing that of a feature film.

History

Early years
The series is the direct descendant of two old-time radio dramatic anthologies sponsored previously by Hallmark: Radio Reader's Digest, adapting stories from the popular magazine (though the magazine never sponsored the show); and, its successor, Hallmark Playhouse, which premiered on CBS in 1948. The Hallmark Playhouse changed to more serious literature from all genres.

Hallmark Television Playhouse debuted on December 24, 1951, on NBC television network, with the first opera written specifically for television, Amahl and the Night Visitors featuring the ballet dancer Nicholas Magallanes.
Playhouse was hosted by Sarah Churchill and was a weekly half-hour. In 1953, the series was renamed Hallmark Hall of Fame. It was the first time a major corporation developed a television project specifically as a means of promoting its products to the viewing public. The program was such a success that it was restaged by Hallmark several times during a period of fifteen years. Amahl was also staged by other NBC television anthologies. Under the supervision of creative executives at its advertising agency, Foote, Cone, and Belding in Chicago, Hallmark also transformed its radio Hallmark Playhouse into a Hallmark Hall of Fame format—this time, featuring stories of pioneers of all types in America—from 1953 through 1955.

Early productions included some of the classical works of Shakespeare: Hamlet, Richard II, The Taming of the Shrew, Macbeth, Twelfth Night, and The Tempest. Biographical subjects were very eclectic, ranging from Florence Nightingale to Father Flanagan to Joan of Arc. Popular Broadway plays such as Harvey, Dial M for Murder, and Kiss Me, Kate were made available to a mass audience, most of them with casts that had not appeared in the film versions released to theatres. In a few cases, the actors repeated their original Broadway roles. Actors such as Richard Burton, Alfred Lunt, Lynn Fontanne, Maurice Evans, Katharine Cornell, Julie Harris, Laurence Olivier and Peter Ustinov all made what were then extremely rare television appearances in these plays.

Two different productions of Hamlet have been broadcast on the Hallmark Hall of Fame, one featuring Maurice Evans (1953) and the other a British one featuring Richard Chamberlain (1970). Neither version was more than two hours long. Evans and actress Judith Anderson performed their famous stage Macbeth on the Hallmark Hall of Fame on two separate occasions, each time with a different supporting cast. The first version in 1954 was telecast live from NBC's Brooklyn color studio while the second in 1960 was filmed on location in Scotland and released to movie theaters in Europe after its American telecast. The Richard Chamberlain version of Hamlet, which was also telecast in Britain on ITV Sunday Night Theatre, won five Emmys when telecast on the Hallmark Hall of Fame, out of a total of thirteen nominations. It may have set a record for the most-nominated Shakespeare production to ever be televised.

In 1955, Hallmark Hall of Fame switched its format to a special series seen only four to eight times a year around greeting card holidays and in 90-minute or 120-minute length. Starting in 1970, the frequency dropped to two to three times a year. The source material were plays and novel from major authors and were produced with stage actors and actresses.

Hamlet, Macbeth and the other Shakespeare plays presented on Hallmark Hall of Fame were cut (sometimes drastically) to fit the time limits of a standard film or of the Hallmark Hall of Fame itself, which during the 1950s, '60s and '70s never ran longer than two hours and frequently even less. It was left to National Educational Television (NET) and Public Broadcasting Service (PBS) to be the pioneers in presenting nearly complete Shakespeare productions on American television.

As a result of Foote, Cone, and Belding Advertising executive and producer Duane C. Bogie's influence, Hallmark Hall of Fame began to offer original material, such as Aunt Mary (1979) and Thursday's Child  (1983), although its lineup still primarily consisted of expensive-looking Masterpiece Theatre-style adaptations of American and European literary classics, such as John Steinbeck's The Winter of Our Discontent (1983), Robert Louis Stevenson's The Master of Ballantrae (1984), and Charles Dickens's A Tale of Two Cities (1980), Oliver Twist (1982), and A Christmas Carol (1984). A Tale of Two Cities was the first Hallmark production (and to date, one of the very few) to run three hours. The late 1980s featured productions such as Foxfire (1987), My Name is Bill W. (1989), Sarah, Plain and Tall (1991), O Pioneers! (1992), To Dance With the White Dog (1993), The Piano Lesson (1995), and What the Deaf Man Heard (1997). One installment, Promise (1986), featuring James Garner and James Woods, won five Emmys, two Golden Globes, a Peabody award, a Humanitas Prize, and a Christopher Award.

Post-NBC 
For nearly three decades the series was broadcast by NBC, but the network cancelled it in 1979 due to declining ratings. Since then, the series has been televised by CBS from 1979 to 1989 (except for briefly on PBS in 1981), then on ABC from 1989 to 1994.

Through the 1980s and 1990s, Hallmark Hall of Fame movies often had twice the budget of other network movies.  Hallmark movies also ran (in some cases) approximately 10–15 minutes longer (or up to 110 minutes minus commercials) because Hallmark Cards fully sponsored the movies and had fewer commercial breaks. Unlike most network movies of the period, Hallmark always filmed on location,  and usually filmed for 24 days, compared to 18–20 days for most other TV-movies.

Richard Welsh Company was retained in 1982 to work on developing HoF projects. Brad Moore was placed in charge of the Hallmark Hall of Fame in 1983.

In February 1992, Hallmark Cards had formed Signboard Hill Productions as sister production company leveraging HHOFP management and expertise to produce some Hall of Fame movies.

CBS picked up the series again from 1994 until 2011 (16 years), when that network cancelled the series due to low ratings. The series was three movies a year with the last one, Beyond the Blackboard, on April 24, 2011.

On November 27, 2011, Hallmark Hall of Fame returned to ABC with Have a Little Faith, which debuted to very low ratings for the night. The total number of viewers was estimated at 6.5 million, compared to 13.5 million for the Hallmark Hall of Fame presentation of November Christmas on the weekend after Thanksgiving in 2010. Encore broadcasts of these ABC episodes aired on Hallmark Channel a week after their initial broadcast on ABC. The films were also available for streaming on the website Feeln.com a few days after airing.

In September 2014, it was announced that the Hallmark Hall of Fame will air exclusively on the Hallmark Channel for the foreseeable future, ending the program's 63-year run on broadcast television. The first episode to debut on Hallmark Channel was One Christmas Eve, starring Anne Heche. On the cable channel, four original movies at most would air as a part of the Hall of Fame with multiple encores. The HHOF library would also be available.
 
In February 2016, Hallmark Cards, which had been directly involved in the production of Hall of Fame from its inception, would transfer the series' division to a subsidiary, Crown Media Productions. Hallmark Cards will still continue to sponsor the program and oversee the creative process.

Episodes 

Only a small number of Hallmark Hall of Fame episodes have been released on VHS and DVD. The 1960 production of the Tempest and the 1966 production of Lamp at Midnight were released as VHS tapes by Films for the Humanities; they have not been released in DVD format.

The Hallmark Hall of Fame division does not own most of the films from the series from 1951 to the 1970s. Hallmark Channel since 1999 has attempted to gain rights to these films.

Hallmark Hall of Fame Productions
Hallmark Hall of Fame Productions LLC (HHOFP) is a TV film production company that produces films for the Hallmark Hall of Fame Productions and is owned by Crown Media Productions.

Hallmark Hall of Fame Productions' first credited film was an adaptation of The Tempest in 1960. Richard Welsh Company was retained in 1982 to work on developing HoF projects. Hallmark Hall of Fame Productions, Inc. was incorporated on September 27, 1994. In February 1992, Hallmark Cards had formed Signboard Hill Productions as sister production company leveraging HHOFP management and expertise. The Hallmark Hall of Fame division, including production, was transferred to affiliate Crown Media Productions.

See also
List of Hallmark Channel Original Movies
Walt Disney anthology television series
World Masterpiece Theater

References

External links
 
 Hallmark Hall of Fame Productions  at BFI
 at CVTA with list of episodes
Zoot Radio, free old time radio show downloads of Hallmark Playhouse.
 
Amahl and the Night Visitors - Premier episode of the Hallmark Hall of Fame (1951) on archive.org

1951 American television series debuts
1950s American drama television series
1960s American drama television series
1970s American drama television series
1980s American drama television series
1990s American drama television series
2000s American drama television series
2010s American drama television series
American Broadcasting Company original programming
Black-and-white American television shows
CBS original programming
English-language television shows
 
American motion picture television series
NBC original programming
PBS original programming
Peabody Award-winning television programs
Primetime Emmy Award for Outstanding Drama Series winners
Hallmark Cards
1950s American anthology television series
1960s American anthology television series
1970s American anthology television series
1980s American anthology television series
1990s American anthology television series
2000s American anthology television series
2010s American anthology television series
2020s American anthology television series
Hallmark Channel